Il Messaggiere, from 1800 Il Messaggere (English: "The Messenger"), was a newspaper published in Modena between 1749 and 1859, with some interruptions during the Napoleonic era. It was the official newspaper of the Duchy of Modena and Reggio.

History
After the last number in 1700 of the Modona no other newspaper was printed in Modena till Francesco III d'Este, Duke of Modena, requested to Abbot Antonio Bernardi to start publishing the Messaggiere. Bernardi, whose nickname was as Abate Falloppia, used to publish in Venice an handwritten avviso titled Europa and moved to Modena in summer 1749. The first number of the Messaggiere is dated 14 August 1749. It was issued on a weekly basis the Wednesdays and the printers had been Tip. Zuliani Claudio e Antonio and later Soliani Bartolomeo.

An article published in the Messaggiere on 27 July 1756 hurt the prime minister Felice Antonio Bianchi, who obtained from the Duke the dismissal of Bernardi: his last number of the newspaper was published on 25 August 1756. On 1 September 1756 the newspaper was issued by the new publisher Pellegrino Niccolò Loschi. It was always issued on a weekly basis and the printers was Tip. Eredi di Bartolomeo Soliani. The image near the title was a courier riding a horse to a town on the right: on 25 May 1757 the image was reverted, with the town on the left.

The newspaper covered the main public events in Modena but the most of the space was dedicated to foreign affairs, in particular to the ones relevant to the Habsburg Empire. To Loschi followed other publishers, all very careful to follow the political line of the Duke: Camillo Tori from 6 June 1759, Mr. Renza from 1761, Giuseppe Maria Cavi from 1770, Giovan Battista Munarini from 1782 to 1796.

From 1 July 1767 the design of the first page changed: the only image was the coat of arms of the House of Este, who ruled the Duchy of Modena, without headlines and the title was Il Messaggiere nestled into the coat of arms. From 1 March 1780 it retained only the coat of arms without any title.

The last number of the Messaggiere during the Ancien Régime was published on 4 May 1796, three days before the Duke Ercole III d'Este fled to Venice because of the  French invasion. During the Napoleonic era the Messaggiere returned to be published two times, from 22 January to 18 June 1800 and from 16 January to 27 December 1805, always edited by the Soliani with the coat of arms of the Este and the usual title. The closures were due in 1800 to the victory of Napoleon in the Battle of Marengo and in 1805 to disagreements with the French government.

With the dissolution of the Napoleonic Kingdom of Italy in 1814, following the Battle of Waterloo, the Duchy of Modena and Reggio was restored, and the newspaper was again published by the Solians starting from 4 January 1815, with the title Il Messaggiere Modenese on a biweekly basis. In 1822 it passed from the Soliani Printing house to the Printing press of the Government.

As the official newspaper of Duchy it run till 18 April 1848, when it ceased due to the Revolutions of 1848. The Il Messaggere was published again from 1 September 1848, merging also the experience of other reactionary newspapers published in Modena.{{efn|such as the Diario Modenese (published 23 March to 30 August 1848) and the previous Il Foglio di Modena (published 6 July 1841 to 20  5 March 1848), and La voce della verità (published 5 July 1831 to 28 June 1841).}} The newspaper in these years had had a circulation of about five hundred copies, and was published three times a week, on Mondays, Wednesdays, Fridays, and sometimes also the Saturdays in a half edition.

After the Battle of Magenta, on 11 June 1859 Francis V, Duke of Modena fled marking the end of the Duchy of Modena and Reggio. The 10 June the Messaggere had been published in the usual form for the last time, on 15 June it retained the old name but substituted the coat of Arms of the House of Austria-Este with the one of the House of Savoy, on 20 June it changed the name into Gazzetta di Modena.

The Gazzetta di Modena'', which wanted to be the official newspaper of the Government of the town, had a circulation of about two thousand copies. The last number was published on 30 October 1862.

Notes

References

Defunct newspapers published in Italy
Italian-language newspapers
Mass media in Modena
Publications established in 1749
Publications disestablished in 1859